Posthaste is the second studio album by the band OHMphrey, released on April 10, 2012 through Magna Carta Records. It features two additional live tracks that were recorded at Winston's in San Diego, California from a concert in 2009.

Track listing

Personnel
Chris Poland – guitar, mixing
Jake Cinninger – guitar
Joel Cummins – keyboard
Kris Myers – drums
Robertino Pagliari – bass

References

External links
Posthaste - Ohmphrey at Allmusic
Ohmphrey - Posthaste Review at Sonic Escapes
Review: "OHMphrey: Post Haste" at Sea of Tranquility

2012 albums
Magna Carta Records albums